IWW, or Industrial Workers of the World (known as the Wobblies), are an international union founded in 1905.

IWW may also refer to:
Industrial WasteWater (see Industrial wastewater treatment )
Inland waterway, a navigable river, canal, or sound
Irish Whip Wrestling, an Irish-owned independent professional wrestling promotion established in 2002

Music
It Was Written, the second studio album by American rapper Nas